Bertrand Jean Gachot (born 23 December 1962) is a French former racing driver. Gachot enjoyed some success in the junior formulae, winning titles in Formula Ford before progressing through Formula 3 and Formula 3000, reaching Formula One in 1989. After winning the 1991 24 Hours of Le Mans, Gachot was sentenced to 18 months in prison for an aggravated assault that had occurred the previous December. He was released after two months on appeal, but his enforced absence enabled Michael Schumacher to make his Grand Prix debut.

Career
Gachot was born in Luxembourg on 23 December 1962, the son of a French European Commission official and a German mother. He began karting at the age of 15. In 1983 he attended the Winfield School, a racing driving school based at the Paul Ricard circuit where Gachot competed with fellow future F1 drivers Damon Hill, Jean Alesi, and Eric Bernard for the Volant Elf; a prize of a season in Formula Renault backed by Elf. Although Bernard won the lucrative prize, Gachot subsequently dropped out of university to focus on his racing career. In 1984 he competed in Formula Ford 1600, and finished third at the Formula Ford Festival, and then won the European series in 1985 driving for Pacific Racing. In 1986 he moved up to Formula Ford 2000 and had a fierce rivalry with Mark Blundell, with Gachot winning the British series and Blundell winning the European series.

Gachot joined the British Formula Three series in 1987, finishing second in the championship for the West Surrey Racing team behind Johnny Herbert. He switched to the Formula 3000 series in 1988, and met with some success, taking pole position at the Silverstone round, and finishing second to Roberto Moreno who went on to win the championship; Gachot finishing fifth in the final standings.

Formula One 

By this stage Gachot was considered one of the sport's most promising young drivers. He was signed by the newly formed Onyx team, having played a role in attracting the team's Moneytron sponsorship from businessman Jean-Pierre Van Rossem, and was partnered with the experienced Stefan Johansson. The team was well funded, but late in getting its car prepared. As a new entrant it was obliged to pre-qualify, and it was not until the French Grand Prix that Gachot made it onto the grid. He started 11th (two places ahead of Johansson) and ran in the points until battery problems dropped him to an eventual 13th and last. Despite qualifying for four of the next five events, he was then fired by van Rossem after complaining about his lack of testing time; his private grievances were publicly aired in an Onyx press release, and he was replaced with JJ Lehto. Gachot then found employment with the struggling Rial team for the final two races of the season, failing to qualify its ageing chassis for either race. The team folded over the winter.

1990 was initially more promising, as he switched to the Coloni team. The small Italian outfit had signed an exclusive deal with Subaru to use its new Carlo Chiti-designed and Motori Moderni-built 1235 flat-12 engine, and Gachot was selected to drive the sole entry. However, the engine was overweight and underpowered, resulting in a poorly-handling car that rarely ran for more than a few laps; he appeared to have little prospect of getting out of pre-qualifying. At the season opener in Phoenix, his gear selector rod broke on his first flying lap and he was unable to set a representative time. Subaru withdrew entirely after the British Grand Prix. After that the car ran with a Cosworth DFR engine, and performances improved; the withdrawal of Onyx ironically promoted Gachot to the main qualifying sessions, but the car still was not quick enough and he failed to make the grid all season.

Despite this, Gachot was still highly regarded, both as a driver and a marketeer, and was signed to lead the new Jordan Grand Prix team, sponsored by 7-Up and using Ford HB engines. The Gary Anderson-designed 191 was competitive, and after some initial reliability problems became a regular points-scorer; Gachot finished 5th in Canada and 6th twice. The season started off well as he gathered considerable acclaim for his Grand Prix performances, and also won the 1991 24 Hours of Le Mans driving a Mazda 787B. He then set the fastest lap at the Hungarian Grand Prix after a late tyre change but his then fortunes took a dramatic turn.

1991 prison sentence
On 10 December 1990 Gachot was due to meet with Jordan and representatives of 7-Up but, on the way and running late, he became involved in a road rage incident with a taxi driver at Hyde Park Corner in London. His car collided with the back of the taxi, but caused no damage to either car. Later, Gachot said the taxi driver pulled him by the tie and raised his fist, at which point Gachot sprayed the taxi driver with CS gas to defend himself. Gachot hid the CS gas canister in a toilet cistern in a nearby building, and was arrested and charged with actual bodily harm (ABH) and possession of a prohibited weapon.

Gachot's trial at Southwark Crown Court was scheduled the week before the 1991 Belgian Grand Prix, a circuit where he expected the Jordan to "fly". Gachot had claimed self-defence, and expected a fine or suspended sentence; he was due to test at Monza after the trial. Instead he was sentenced to 18 months in HMP Brixton after an unsuccessful appeal.

The situation prompted a campaign of support organised by Belgian racing driver Pascal Witmeur. This campaign involved flags, T-shirts worn by members of the public and racing drivers, graffiti in several locations of the Spa-Francorchamps track during the 1991 Belgian Grand Prix, and prominent sponsorship on Witmeur's Formula 3000 car. Team owner Eddie Jordan replaced him with Michael Schumacher, whose performance at Spa led to a drive with Benetton. Gachot subsequently said that prison was "a fantastic human experience" and he had about 10,000 letters of support.

Return to F1
After two months in prison Gachot's sentence was reduced by the Court of Appeal and he was released. Having missed four Grands Prix, he returned to the F1 paddock at Suzuka to try and retake his Jordan seat from Alessandro Zanardi. The team refused, though Gachot found employment with Larrousse, replacing the injured Éric Bernard for the Australian Grand Prix. He failed to qualify the unfamiliar car, but impressed the team enough to be offered the seat for the following season.

The team ran a Robin Herd-designed Venturi chassis with V12 Lamborghini engines, but suffered reliability and financial problems throughout the season. Gachot and teammate Ukyo Katayama only managed 6 classified finishes between them from 31 starts, colliding with each other twice. Gachot scored the team's only point of the year with 6th place at Monaco. He also finished 4th for Mazda at Le Mans.

1993 saw him out of Formula 1. He raced for Dick Simon Racing in CART, placing 12th at the Molson Indy Toronto in a one-off drive, and raced in Japanese touring car series for Honda while helping Keith Wiggins' Pacific team prepare to enter Formula One the following season. After becoming a shareholder in the team, Gachot was signed to drive as number 1 alongside pay driver Paul Belmondo for the 1994 season. The PR01 was initially designed as the car for Reynard's proposed entry into the series, used 1992-spec Ilmor V10 engines and was not competitive. After Gachot outqualified Roland Ratzenberger to give the team its debut at the opening round, the Pacifics never again beat fellow newcomers Simtek to the grid; although a series of accidents in the sport led to several reduced entries and Gachot starting a further four races, he failed to finish any. While he had the upper hand over Belmondo after the Canadian Grand Prix, he did not make the grid again that season.

Gachot stayed with Pacific for 1995, with the new PR02 chassis, Cosworth ED engines and an influx of experienced personnel after a merger with the remains of Team Lotus. There were only 26 entrants; hence, he was a guaranteed starter, and the reliable package meant the car could at least finish races, though Gachot and teammate Andrea Montermini were largely left battling at the back of the grid. The team's finances were tight, and Gachot stood down mid-season so that pay drivers Giovanni Lavaggi and Jean-Denis Délétraz could take his seat and bring some money to Pacific. After Délétraz's sponsors defaulted on payments, the team planned to rent the drive to Formula Nippon driver Katsumi Yamamoto for the two races in Japan, but he was not granted a superlicence, so Gachot retook the seat. Gachot also intended to hand the car over to the team's test driver Oliver Gavin for the season finale in Australia; however, the Englishman was also refused a superlicence and the Frenchman was forced back into the car, equalling the team's best result with 8th place after much of the field had retired. It was Gachot's final Grand Prix, for Pacific folded at the end of the season.

Gachot formed his own sports car team with the aim of participating in the 1996 24 Hours of Le Mans. The team entered a Welter Racing LM94 with factory support and engine from SsangYong, in what was a rare motorsport outing for the South Korean automotive manufacturer. The car participated in the pre-qualifying session but did not qualify for the race. It was again entered in the Coupes d'Automne Automobile Club de l'Ouest, a four-hour sports car race held at the Le Mans Bugatti circuit later in the 1996 season, where it qualified 3rd but did not finish.

Gachot later drove in occasional sports car and GT races for a variety of manufacturers and privateers.

Business interests
Following his F1 career Gachot began to develop his business portfolio, he signed a distribution agreement with Hype Energy Drinks in 1997. The company had been started in 1994 by the founder of Hard Rock Cafe, Brian Cox, and had been sponsoring motorsports including F1. Gachot had aimed to introduce the brand into France but by 2000 had taken a leadership role within Hype Energy; he began restructuring the company, simplifying the product portfolio, keeping only four flavours on the market. Growth had followed shortly after and by 2014 he was able to put Hype Energy back into the F1 Paddock with sponsorship of André Lotterer. 2015 saw Gachot come full circle as Hype Energy announced a sponsorship deal with Force India F1 Team, the team who had previously been Jordan F1 and for whom Gachot had raced. Gachot utilised this and other sponsorships to push the brand into new markets, announcing sales in the USA later that year. By 2017 Gachot had been pushing the brand further into the music industry, working with Migos, Mike WiLL Made It and Prince Royce. He still continues to fill the role of CEO at the company.

Gachot also owns F1i.com, a Formula 1 news site.

Nationality

Gachot raced under more than one flag during his career. He initially competed with a Belgian FIA Super Licence, despite carrying a French passport. From the 1992 season onwards he changed to a French licence.

Gachot is a supporter of the unification of Europe. In a 1991 interview, Gachot said that "I am not really one nationality. I feel very much a European, but today I have to accept that a united Europe is not yet a reality. Certainly from a legal point of view." His helmet design features the circle of yellow stars on a blue background from the flag of Europe.

Racing record

Career summary

Complete British Formula 3 results
(key)

Complete International Formula 3000 results
(key) (Races in bold indicate pole position) (Races
in italics indicate fastest lap)

Complete Formula One results
(key)

Complete 24 Hours of Le Mans results

American Open Wheel racing results
(key)

CART

Complete JGTC results
(key)

References

External links

1962 births
Living people
Belgian racing drivers
French racing drivers
Belgian Formula One drivers
French Formula One drivers
Onyx Formula One drivers
Rial Formula One drivers
Coloni Formula One drivers
Jordan Formula One drivers
Larrousse Formula One drivers
Pacific Formula One drivers
Sportspeople from Luxembourg City
Champ Car drivers
British Formula Three Championship drivers
24 Hours of Le Mans drivers
24 Hours of Le Mans winning drivers
International Formula 3000 drivers
World Sportscar Championship drivers
Formula One team owners
Oreca drivers
TOM'S drivers